Andrei Ruslanovich Altybarmakyan (born 4 August 1998) is a Russian professional ice hockey forward currently playing with SKA Saint Petersburg in the Kontinental Hockey League (KHL). He was selected by the Chicago Blackhawks, in the third-round 70th overall in the 2017 NHL Entry Draft.

Playing career
Altybarmakyan originally played as a youth within SKA Saint Petersburg junior program. He made his professional debut with secondary team, SKA-Neva in the Supreme Hockey League during the 2016–17 season.

In the 2017–18 season, Altybarmakyan made his Kontinental Hockey League debut with SKA, making 14 appearances. In the following 2018–19 season, while playing with SKA Neva, Altybarmakyan was traded to HC Sochi on 15 October 2018.

Altybarmakyan played two seasons within Sochi, registering a career high 6 goals and 17 points through 49 games in the 2019–20 season.

On 3 April 2020, Altybarmakyan left Russia and was signed to a two-year, entry-level contract with the Chicago Blackhawks.

After two seasons in the AHL with Blackhawks affiliate, the Rockford IceHogs, as an impending restricted free agent, Altybarmakyan was not tendered a qualifying offer by the rebuilding Blackhawks, and was released to free agency on 12 July 2022. On the same day his KHL rights were traded from SKA Saint Petersburg to HC Sochi in exchange for Kirill Melnichenko. He was later signed to a two-year contract with Sochi beginning in the 2022–23 season.

Altybarmakyan registered 6 goals and 16 points through 38 regular season games with Sochi before he was returned to SKA Saint Petersburg in a trade for financial compensation on 23 December 2022.

Career statistics

Regular season and playoffs

International

References

External links
 

1998 births
Living people
Russian people of Armenian descent
Rockford IceHogs (AHL) players
Russian ice hockey right wingers
SKA-Neva players
SKA Saint Petersburg players
HC Sochi players
Ice hockey people from Saint Petersburg